WVTT may refer to:

WVTT-CD, on TV channel 11 (virtual 34) and licensed to Olean, New York
WCOP (FM), a radio station (103.9 FM) licensed to serve Eldred, Pennsylvania, United States, which held the call sign WVTT in 2011 and again in 2019
WCOR-FM, on 96.7 and licensed to Portville, New York, was WVTT from 2011 to 2019